The Distress for Rent Act 1689 (2 Will & Mary c 5) is an Act of the Parliament of England. Its long title is "An Act for enabling the Sale of Goods distrained for Rent in case the Rent be not paid in a reasonable time."

This Act was partly in force in Great Britain at the end of 2010.

The whole Act is prospectively repealed by sections 86 and 146 of, and paragraph 1 of Schedule 14 to, and Part 4 of Schedule 23 to, the Tribunals, Courts and Enforcement Act 2007. This is consequential on the prospective abolition of distress for rent.

References
Halsbury's Statutes,

External links
The Distress for Rent Act 1689, as amended, from Legislation.gov.uk.
The original text of the act.

Acts of the Parliament of England
1689 in law
1689 in England